The Business Enterprise Trust, a nonprofit organization which was based in Palo Alto, California, celebrated exemplary acts of courage, integrity and social vision in American business.  The organization's purpose was to examine specific instances of bold, creative leadership that combined sound business management with social conscience.

Television Producer Norman Lear, working with James E. Burke, the former chairman and CEO of Johnson and Johnson, founded the Business Enterprise Trust (BET) in 1989. The two recruited some of the leading lights of American business and labor for its board of directors, including:
	
Warren E. Buffett of Berkshire Hathaway
Katharine Graham of the Washington Post company
Henry B. Schact of Lucent Technologies
Robert A. Iger of Capital Cities/ABC Inc.
Ambassador Sol M. Linowitz
Robert Reich, former Secretary of Labor
Douglas Fraser of the United Auto Workers

From 1991 to 1997, the BET hosted an annual awards ceremony in New York City and produced short video documentaries, business school cases and teaching notes.  The stories of twenty-five of the thirty BET awardees are featured in the book Aiming Higher (AMACOM, 1996).  An extensive array of business education materials is still available through Harvard Business School Publishing.  These materials have been used in more than 500 business schools, universities and corporate management training programs throughout the country.

The BET awards were gala affairs that featured such keynote speakers as President Bill Clinton, First Lady Hillary Clinton, Vice President Albert Gore, Senator Bill Bradley, and journalist Bill Moyers. The breakfast ceremonies in the Rainbow Room of Rockefeller Center were hosted by Moyers, Diane Sawyer, and Barbara Walters, among others, and were attended by such business leaders as Laurence Tisch, Jack Welch, and John Walton.  Five honorees were recognized each year for blending product innovation with social concern, for pioneering successful business models in the inner city, for improving workforce diversity, and for achieving superior corporate performance by appealing to the best in their employees.

In addition to awards for specific acts of social innovation, the BET also presented Lifetime Achievement Awards to such visionaries as J. Irwin Miller of Cummins Engine, James Rouse of the Rouse Company, Frank Stanton of CBS, and the Haas Family of Levi Strauss & Company.

Long-term funding failed to materialize, and the BET ceased operations in 1998.

References

Non-profit organizations based in California
Norman Lear